Liu Fei (October 26, 1898 – April 8, 1983) was a Chinese male politician and army general, who served as the vice chairperson of the Chinese People's Political Consultative Conference.

References 

1898 births
1983 deaths
Vice Chairpersons of the National Committee of the Chinese People's Political Consultative Conference